"Die4U" (stylised as "DiE4u") is a song by British rock band Bring Me the Horizon. Produced by BloodPop and Evil Twin, it was released as the lead single from the group's upcoming second Post Human release, following 2020's Post Human: Survival Horror, on 16 September 2021. 
The song peaked at number 5 on the Billboard Mainstream Rock Songs chart in February 2022.

"Die4U" was remixed by Six Impala, retitled as "Die6U" (stylised as "DiE6u"). The hyperpop remix was released on 17 December 2021.

Promotion and release
On 2 September 2021, the band teased the new song on their social media platforms that they were working on along with cryptic teasers until they formally announced the release for the newly titled "Die4U" for 16 September 2021. Alongside this, they were promoting and inviting their fans to join "Club H3llh0le" for the same date, which would later be revealed as a teaser for the music video. Leading up to the release of the single, the band would relentlessly tease the same 20-second snippet of the song on all their social media platforms, most notably on TikTok. On the day of the single's release, the song made its worldwide debut on BBC Radio 1's Future Sounds show with Clara Amfo where "Die4U" was the hottest record of the day. The band performed the song on their upcoming September 2021 UK tour at all dates and later played "Die4U" in an acoustic format at the BBC Radio 1 Live Lounge on 30 September to promote the release of the single.

Composition and lyrics
"Die4U" has been described by critics as a pop-punk, pop rock, alternative rock, hard rock, electronic rock, emo, and a post-hardcore song. The song was written by the band's lead vocalist Oliver Sykes, keyboardist Jordan Fish, BloodPop, Rami Yacoub and Madison Love, while it was produced by BloodPop and Evil Twin. "Die4U" was recorded remotely while Sykes was stuck in Brazil due to the lockdowns during the COVID-19 pandemic while Fish was in the UK with the rest of the band. The lyrics talk about the deals with addiction from the perspective of a toxic relationship. Sykes himself has experienced drug addiction in the past, saying that it "took away who he was" and nearly resulted in him ending his own life. He later found relief after attending rehab sessions, though disagrees with some of the principles used in his recovery. Musically, it is described by the front-man as "future emo." Sykes explained:

Critical reception
The release of "Die4U" left fans and critics divided. The critics were more favourable while fans of the band were left having very mixed opinions on the song. Critics noted the song leaning more towards a pop oriented style compared to the nu metal sound from Post Human: Survival Horror. Writing for NME, Andrew Trendell wrote, "With 'DiE4u' retaining BMTH's trademark heaviness but driven by what could perhaps be their most pop-driven sound yet." Warren Litberg of Top Shelf pointed out how the song combined the extremes from both Count Your Blessings and Amo while also labelling it as a "great party song." Emily Harris of GSGMedia rated "Die4U" as a 4 out of 5, praising Sykes' vocal performances as a highlight as well as the lyrics, melody and the powerful refrain. Rock Sound writer, Jack Rogers, described the single as an "unstoppable force", explaining: "Melodically gripping, irresistibly slick, densely layered and beautifully dark, it's yet another triumph." Paul Brown of Wall of Sound while generally praising the track was also a bit more critical, labelling the song as "predictable", calling the lyrics "very safe" and comparing the song to the likes of The Amity Affliction.

Despite the mixed reception, the track won the 'Best Song' award at the 2022 Kerrang! Awards, beating out four other nominations in a reader vote. In doing so, "Die4U" became the first Bring Me the Horizon track to win the award, after three prior nominations.

Music video

The music video for "Die4U" was released shortly after the single was initially streamed. The video was directed by frontman and primary songwriter Oliver Sykes. It was shot in an abandoned warehouse in Kyiv, Ukraine which got a makeover to appear as a nightclub for vampires dubbed as "Club Hellhole". The video was noted by critics from taking inspiration from the Blade franchise.

Speaking about the music video in a behind the scenes video for the song on the band's YouTube channel. Sykes states:

The music video starts with a man and a woman walking up to a nightclub in a warehouse who speak Ukrainian when they get stopped by a bouncer to show forms of ID. The woman flashes up her wrist, revealing the single cover art for "Die4U" to the bouncer who then proceeds to let them into the club as the song starts. The man and the woman part ways as the band start to perform the song on stage in front of a bunch of partygoers in the club. The woman gets signalled over by a strange-looking mysterious vampire akin to a goblin who then proceeds to show him blood capsules in the briefcase that she was holding the entire time. During this time, it is slowly revealed to the man that this is no ordinary nightclub, but rather a nightclub filled with vampires as he's being pushed around by the partygoers as they then proceed to grab ahold of him as he's screaming. Just as the band are about to get to the bridge, the goblin looking vampire goes to grab one of the blood capsules but the woman pulls out a gun pointing it to his head before he can grab hold of a capsule. The band stops playing the song as the woman then gets held at gunpoint unexpectedly by a bunch of guests around her as tension arises. This would also reveal the same man from earlier who points a gun at her and reveals that he's was working undercover, before grinning and shooting an innocent partygoer. This starts an all-out massacre at the nightclub as people scream trying to escape. In the scramble, the goblin looking vampire also shoots at guests before then biting into the neck of the woman who screams. Another woman proceeds to repeatedly stab someone to death with a knife to the gut as tons of blood gushes over her face as she maniacally laughs. The man who is undercover then gets attacked by a bunch of vampires and eaten to death as the band start to perform the song again, resuming as the bridge starts. The band proceed to get soaked in a bloodbath of blood pouring over their heads as they get to the final chorus, resulting in a bloody rave and a visual of the frontman Oli Sykes also being confirmed as a vampire as the song ends.

Personnel
Credits adapted from Tidal.

Bring Me the Horizon
 Oliver Sykes – lead vocals, composition, lyrics
 Lee Malia – guitars
 Jordan Fish – keyboards, programming, percussion, backing vocals, engineering, composition, lyrics
 Matt Kean – bass
 Matt Nicholls – drums

Additional personnel
 BloodPop – production, programming, composition, lyrics
 Zakk Cervini – mastering, mixing
 Evil Twin – production
 Gupi – misc production
 Nik Trekov – mixing assistant
 Madison Love – composition, lyrics
 Rami Yacoub – composition, lyrics

Charts

Weekly charts

Year-end charts

References

2021 songs
2021 singles
Bring Me the Horizon songs
Songs written by Oliver Sykes
RCA Records singles
Sony Music singles
British pop punk songs
British pop rock songs
Electronic rock songs
Emo songs
Songs about drugs
Songs about death
Songs written by Rami Yacoub
Songs written by BloodPop
Song recordings produced by BloodPop
Songs written by Madison Love